"The Laughing Policeman" is a music hall song recorded by British artist Charles Penrose, published under the pseudonym Charles Jolly in 1922. It is an adaptation of "The Laughing Song" by American singer George W. Johnson with the same tune and form but different subject matter, first recorded in 1890.

"The Laughing Song" 

In 1890, George W. Johnson started his recording career in the fledgling phonograph industry, and one of the songs he recorded was "The Laughing Song". The song features Johnson in the persona of a "dandy darky" who laughs in time to the music.  Singing with laughter in time to the music has been heard in songs since "L'éclat de rire" or the "Laughing Song" in the 1856 opera Manon Lescaut by Daniel Auber, and Johnson's song showed clear influence from that tradition.  

Johnson's "Laughing Song" proved highly popular with the public, and it was ranked number one on the reconstructed pop chart for ten weeks from April from June 1891.  Johnson was the first black performer to appear on America's popular music chart,  and he was also the first to have a charted song known to have been written by an African American. However, the authorship of "The Laughing Song" is uncertain; sheet music of the song was published in 1894 and Johnson credited himself as the writer of both the words and music, but some questioned if he actually wrote the lyrics. Johnson also recorded a song entitled "The Whistling Coon" written in 1878 by minstrel Sam Devere, and that song reached number one in July and August 1891.

"The Laughing Song" was said to have become the best-ever selling phonograph record by 1894, and it was claimed to have sold over 50,000 copies by the late-1890s.  That was a very high number given that at that time it was not possible to mechanically duplicate a record, and a singer had to record the same song four or five copies at a time over and over again. The song was still popular by the early 1900s, although by this time record companies had developed the technology to duplicate records from a single recording. There was no exclusive contract for recording a song at that time, and singers were only paid for recording the song and no royalties were paid to the artists, so Johnson continued to record "The Laughing Song" for different recording companies including Columbia, Victor, and Edison until 1909 or 1910, although by that time it was no longer as lucrative for him to record the song since he was only required to record a few times for the best recording to be duplicated.

"The Laughing Song" was covered by a white performer Burt Shepard in 1900, and it was his version that became known round the world outside of the United States. According to Fred Gaisberg, it sold over half a million copies in India.

Penrose's recordings

Charles Penrose used the melody of "The Laughing Song" as well as the same hook of using laughter in the chorus, but changed the lyrics to be about a policeman, and recorded it under the title of "The Laughing Policeman".  The composition of the song is, however, credited entirely to Billie Grey, a pseudonym of Penrose's second wife Mabel. It is thought that the character of the Laughing Policeman was inspired by real-life police officer PC John 'Tubby' Stephens, a popular figure in Leicester.

In June 1922, Penrose made the first recording of this song, which was released on Regal Records (cat. G-7816.  He released the song under the pseudonym of Charles Jolly. The version more usually heard was recorded on 22 April 1926 and released on Columbia Records (4014 and later FB 1184) under his own name. 

Penrose and his wife wrote numerous other laughing songs (The Laughing Major, Curate, Steeplechaser, Typist, Lover, etc.), but only "The Laughing Policeman" is remembered today, having sold over a million copies. Its popularity continued in later decades as a children song, as it was a frequently requested recording on the BBC Radio 1 show Junior Choice the 1970s, and it remained one of the recordings most-frequently included in children's choice compilations and Radio 2 annual broadcasts even into the 21th century.

New versions 

In 1955, Stikkan Anderson gave the song lyrics in Swedish, as "Den skrattande polisen" ("The laughing police officer"), which was recorded and released by Ove Flodin.

A dance mix was made, released on a 10-inch 45rpm disc, resembling an old-style 78rpm record, with the original version on the other side.

Bernard Cribbins recorded a parody version called 'Giggling Gertie the Laughing Traffic Warden', with the laughter provided by Miriam Margolyes.

Lyrics 
The song describes a fat jolly policeman who cannot stop laughing and has a chorus in which the sound of laughter is made in a sustained semi musical way by the singer. The first verse is:I know a fat old policeman,
he's always on our street,
a fat and jolly red faced man
he really is a treat.
He's too kind for a policeman,
he's never known to frown,
and everybody says he's the happiest man in town.

Chorus
(Ha ha ha ha ha,
Woo ha ha ha ha ha ha ha ha,
Woo ha ha ha ha ha ha ha ha,
Ha ha  ha ha  ha ha ha ha ha ha,
Ha ha  ha .)

In popular culture

Literature
The song is referenced in the 1968 novel The Laughing Policeman   by Swedish writers Maj Sjöwall and Per Wahlöö and film of the same name.  Fictional Swedish detective Martin Beck gets it as a Christmas present from his daughter Ingrid, but doesn't think it is funny. Beck's first laugh after the murder comes when Stenström's death is fully vindicated.

Television
In  One Foot in the Grave episode "The Man Who Blew Away", the Meldrews are constantly kept awake by a late night party across the road, the worst coming when the partygoers join in the chorus of the song.
In an episode of the BBC police drama City Central criminals steal an officer's radio and use it to broadcast the song continuously, disrupting police communications.
In the BBC detective drama, Bergerac,  the episode "Natural Enemies" features the song being played on a gramophone in a children's home, as several children laugh at Charlie Hungerford.
The song is used as the central theme in the Space Pirates episode "Music that Makes Me Laugh".
Ken Dodd performed it as part of one of his appearances on the popular BBC variety show The Good Old Days, getting the audience to laugh with him.
The Wiggles did a parody of the song for their album and video "Wiggle House" titled "The Laughing Doctor".

Film
In the 1936 British film Calling the Tune, a fictional story of rivalry in the early days of the gramophone industry, Charles Penrose is seen recording "The Laughing Policeman" and performing the complete song.
This song inspired the Telugu language song "Vivaha Bojanambu" in the Indian movie Mayabazar.

Postage stamp 

 In 1990 the Royal Mail of the United Kingdom of Great Britain & Northern Ireland issued a 20p greeting stamp entitled The Laughing Policeman which bore an illustration based on the song.

References

External links 
The most famous version - Charles Penrose 'The Laughing Policeman' 1926 on Spotify
The most famous version - Charles Penrose 'The Laughing Policeman' 1926 on YouTube

 "The Laughing Song" - George W. Johnson's recordings - Cylinder Preservation and Digitization Project
 http://www.library.ucsb.edu/OBJID/Cylinder17216 circa 1894 (metadata & mp3)
 http://www.library.ucsb.edu/OBJID/Cylinder14568 1897 (metadata & mp3)
 http://www.library.ucsb.edu/OBJID/Cylinder2381 circa 1902 (metadata & mp3)
 http://www.library.ucsb.edu/OBJID/Cylinder4405 circa 1904-1909 (metadata & mp3)
 Charles Penrose 'The Laughing Policeman' 1935
  Calling the Tune (1936)

1922 songs
Music hall songs
Novelty songs
Comedy songs
Songs about police officers
Fictional police officers